Vinay Bihari is a politician and film director from Bihar. He has won the Bihar Legislative Assembly election in 2010 and 2015 from Lauriya Assembly constituency, Lauriya.
Vinay continuously won 3 elections from the Lauriya assembly constituency of Bihar. 1st election he won was as an independent candidate in 2010 and then he joined BJP and won continuously two elections in 2015 and 2020 on the ticket of Bharatiya Janata Party.  
He defeated Rankaushal Pratap Singh of RJD who got 39778 votes. Vinay Bihari got 57,351 votes in that election.

On 1 March 2017, Bihari ended a months-long protest in which he called for the government to build a 44  km road in his constituency by stripping to his underwear.

In the 2020 Bihar Elections, Bihari contested with the BJP from the Lauriya constituency and defeated RJD's leading campaigner by a very small margin.

References

Living people
People from West Champaran district
Bharatiya Janata Party politicians from Bihar
Bihar MLAs 2010–2015
Bihar MLAs 2015–2020
Bihar MLAs 2020–2025
1970 births